Kurt Michael Kafentzis (born December 31, 1962) is a former American football defensive back who played one season with the Houston Oilers of the National Football League. He played college football at the University of Hawaiʻi at Mānoa and attended Columbia High School in Richland, Washington. He was also a member of the Washington Redskins.

College career
Kafentzis played for the Hawaii Rainbow Warriors from 1981 to 1984.

Professional career

Washington Redskins
Kafentzis was signed by the Washington Redskins in 1985. He was placed on injured reserve by the Redskins on August 20, 1985.

Houston Oilers
Kafentzis signed with the Houston Oilers on June 24, 1986, and was later released by the team. He was signed by the Oilers on October 7, 1987. He played in two games for the Houston Oilers during the 1987 season. Kafentzis was released by the Oilers on October 27, 1987. He later rejoined the Oilers and spent the 1988 off-season with the team before being released on August 8, 1988.

Personal life
Kafentzis was one of five brothers who played for the Hawaii Rainbow Warriors. His brothers Mark, Kent and Kyle all signed with NFL teams.

References

External links
Just Sports Stats

Living people
1962 births
Players of American football from Washington (state)
American football defensive backs
Hawaii Rainbow Warriors football players
Houston Oilers players
People from Richland, Washington